Confessions on a Dance Floor is the tenth studio album by American singer and songwriter Madonna. It was released on November 9, 2005, by Warner Bros. Records. A complete departure from her previous studio album American Life (2003), the album includes influences of 1970s disco and 1980s electropop, as well as modern-day club music. Initially, she began working with Mirwais Ahmadzaï for the album but later felt that their collaboration was not going in the direction she desired. Madonna took her collaboration with Stuart Price who was overseeing her documentary I'm Going to Tell You a Secret. The album was mainly recorded at Price's home-studio where Madonna spent most of her time during the recordings.

Musically, the record is structured like a DJ's set. The songs are sequenced and blended so that they are played continuously without any gaps. The title arrived from the fact that the album tracklisting consists of light-hearted and happy songs in the beginning, and progresses to much darker melodies and lyrics describing personal feelings and commitments. Songs on the album sample and reference the music of other dance-oriented artists like ABBA, Donna Summer, Pet Shop Boys, the Bee Gees and Depeche Mode, as well as Madonna's 1980s output.

Madonna promoted the album through several live performances and a promotional tour. She embarked on the Confessions Tour in 2006, which became the highest-grossing tour ever for a female artist at that time. Four singles were released from the album. "Hung Up", the lead single, topped the charts in a total of 41 countries. According to Billboard, it was the most successful dance song of the decade. It was followed by "Sorry" which became Madonna's twelfth number-one single in the United Kingdom. "Get Together" and "Jump" were also released as singles, both becoming top-ten hits in several countries.

The album received widespread acclaim, with critics calling it a return to form for Madonna and ranking it alongside her best albums. Madonna was honored with a Grammy Award for Best Electronic/Dance Album in 2007, as well as International Female Solo Artist at the 2006 BRIT Awards. Commercially, Confessions on a Dance Floor peaked at number one in 40 countries, earning a place in the 2007 Guinness World Records for topping the record charts in the most countries. The album sold between 3.6 to 4 million copies in its first-week worldwide, and remains one of the best-selling albums of the 21st century, with over 10 million copies. Ranked third on "The 99 Greatest Dance Albums of All Time" by Vice magazine, the album is noted as a testament to Madonna's longevity with the ability to continuously reinvent herself in the third decade of her career.

Background and development 
Confessions on a Dance Floor merged elements from 1970s disco, 1980s electropop and 2000s club music. Madonna decided to incorporate disco-influenced elements in her songs while trying not to remake her music from past, instead choosing to pay tribute towards artists like the Bee Gees and Giorgio Moroder. The songs reflected Madonna's thoughts on love, fame and religion, hence the title Confessions on a Dance Floor. It was the complete opposite direction from her previous studio effort American Life (2003). The songs on that album were a form of diatribe directed at the American society. However, Madonna decided to take a different direction with this album. Regarding the development, Madonna commented:
"When I wrote American Life, I was very agitated by what was going on in the world around me, [...] I was angry. I had a lot to get off my chest. I made a lot of political statements. But now, I feel that I just want to have fun; I want to dance; I want to feel buoyant. And I want to give other people the same feeling. There's a lot of madness in the world around us, and I want people to be happy."
She started to work with Mirwais Ahmadzaï with whom she had previously developed her eighth album Music (2000). However, that collaboration did not suit Madonna's musical direction. According to Madonna, "[Producer] Mirwais is also very political, seriously cerebral and intellectual. All we did was sit around, talking politics all the time. So, that couldn't help but find its way into the music. I think there's an angry aspect to the music that directly reflects my feelings at the time." Hence after recording tracks with Mirwais, Madonna decided to stop the project and start fresh. It was then that she turned to Stuart Price who had served as musical director on her two previous concert tours and co-wrote one song on American Life.

In 2004, after the release of American Life, Madonna began working on two different musicals: one tentatively called Hello Suckers and another one with Luc Besson, who previously directed the music video for her single "Love Profusion", which would portray her as a woman on her deathbed looking back on her life. Madonna collaborated with Patrick Leonard, Ahmadzaï and Price to write new songs, the latter being assigned to pen disco-influenced songs sounding like "ABBA on drugs". However, Madonna found herself dissatisfied with the script written by Besson and scrapped it. Hence Madonna and Price decided to use the compositions for the album instead. According to Madonna, it was easy for her to shift from her previous album's sentiments, since she included those political views in her documentary I'm Going to Tell You a Secret. She elaborated:
I was running back and forth, literally, from the editing room with [the documentary's director] Jonas Akerlund to working with Stuart, who was also mixing the music in the film. We were together, non-stop, all of us. Cutting 350 hours of film down to two hours. There are a lot of serious aspects to the movie. I needed a release. When I would go to Stuart's, and we'd go up to his loft, it was like, 'Honey, I want to dance.' I wanted to be happy, silly and buoyant. I wanted to lift myself and others up with this record. So, yes, the new album was a reaction to all the other stuff I was doing, which was very serious in nature. I hope that doesn't imply that I wanted to make a superficial record, because it's not. I want people to smile when they hear this record. I wanted it to put a smile on my face, too.

Recording 

The first three songs that were written for the album were "Hung Up", "Sorry" and "Future Lovers" In an interview with Billboard, Madonna commented that the recording process was a give-and-take situation. According to her, Price used to stay up all night working on the songs. This was helped by the fact that he is a DJ and is used to staying awake all night. This gave Madonna the chance to work on other aspects of the compositions. She noted the fact that she and Price had opposite characteristics, which helped in their collaboration. The songs were mainly recorded at Price's home. Madonna said:
We did a lot of recording at his house. I'd come by in the morning and Stuart would answer the door in his stocking feet - as he'd been up all night. I'd bring him a cup of coffee and say, 'Stuart, your house is a mess, there's no food in the cupboard.' Then I'd call someone from my house to bring food over for him. And then we'd work all day. We're very much the odd couple.
She further elaborated that their camaraderie was also because they had toured together for Madonna's Re-Invention World Tour. Hence Madonna reflected that her relationship with Price was more of a brother-sister kind than the formal collaborations she was accustomed to during the recording process.

Music and lyrics 

Confessions on a Dance Floor is primarily a dance-pop, nu-disco, EDM, album, which is structured like a nightly set composed by a DJ. The music starts light and happy, and as it progresses, it becomes intense, with the lyrics dealing more about personal feelings, hence "Confessions". According to Madonna, "[t]his is the direction of my record. That's what we intended, to make a record that you can play at a party or in your car, where you don't have to skip past a ballad. It's nonstop." Madonna used samples and references of music by other disco artists. In the album's first song, "Hung Up", she sampled ABBA's 1979 hit "Gimme! Gimme! Gimme! (A Man After Midnight)", for which she wrote a personal letter to songwriters Benny Andersson and Björn Ulvaeus, who permitted Madonna to use the track. References of other disco-influenced acts, including Pet Shop Boys, Depeche Mode, and Daft Punk, were also used on the album, as were the disco hits of Parisian DJ Cerrone. The album has a song called "Forbidden Love", which is different from the same-titled song from Madonna's sixth studio album Bedtime Stories. Regarding sampling herself and her own song names, Madonna commented:
"I did all of that on purpose, [...] I mean, if I'm going to plagiarize somebody, it might as well be me, right? I feel like I've earned the right to rip myself off. 'Talent borrows, genius steals,' [...] "Let's see how many other clichés I can throw in there. That's exactly it. I was only hinting early on, but then I tell it like it is. It's like, now that I have your attention, I have a few things to tell you."

A pulsating rhythm is present in the song "Isaac", which is regarded as the only song close to a ballad on the album. However, the song was heavily criticized by a group of Israeli rabbis who commented that Madonna was committing a blasphemy with their religion. They said that the song was about sixteenth-century Kabbalah scholar Yitzhak Luria. In reality, the song was named after the featured vocalist Yitzhak Sinwani, who sang portions of the Yemenite Hebrew poem Im Nin'alu in the track, as well as references to the Biblical story of Abraham and Isaac. Initially, Madonna toyed with the idea of calling the song "Fear of Flying", since the idea behind the composition was to let go. In the end she decided to just call it "Isaac", after the English version of Sinwani's name. Regarding the song's development and the condemnation of the rabbis, Madonna said:
"You do appreciate the absurdity of a group of rabbis in Israel claiming that I'm being blasphemous about someone when they haven't heard the record, right? And then, everyone in the media runs with it as if it's the truth. And that's a little weird. But what's even weirder is that the song is not about Isaac Lurier, as the rabbis claim. It's named after Yitzhak Sinwani, who's singing in Yemenite on the track. I couldn't think of a title for the song. So I called it "Isaac" [the English transliteration of "Yitzhak"]. It's interesting how their minds work, those naughty rabbis. [...] He's saying, "If all of the doors of all of the generous peoples' homes are closed to you, the gates of heaven will always be open." The words are about 1,000 years old. [...] [Yitzhak] is an old friend of mine. He's never made a record. He comes from generations of beautiful singers. Stuart and I asked him to come into the studio one day. We said, "We're just going to record you. We don't know what we're going to do with it." He's flawless. One take, no bad notes. He doesn't even need a microphone. We took one of the songs he did and I said to Stuart, "Let's sample these bits. We'll create a chorus and then I'll write lyrics around it." That's how we constructed it."

The lyrics of the songs on the album incorporate bits of Madonna's musical history and are written in the form of confessions. "Hung Up" contains lyrics from Madonna's 1989 duet with Prince called "Love Song", from the Like a Prayer album. "How High" continues the themes of two songs from Madonna's eighth studio album Music, namely "Nobody's Perfect" and "I Deserve It". The lyrics of "Push" thank the person who challenged her to expand her limits and also incorporate elements of the Police's song "Every Breath You Take". Other tracks like "Sorry" include the title word in ten different languages (several of which are non-idiomatic). In "I Love New York" (written at the time of American Life), she praises the city where her career began and replies to negative comments made by George W. Bush. Elsewhere, Madonna sings about success and fame ("Let It Will Be") and the crossroads of past, present and future ("Like It or Not").

Promotion 

On November 4, 2005, Madonna opened the 2005 MTV Europe Music Awards with her first performance of "Hung Up". She emerged from a glitter ball to perform the song, while wearing a purple leotard and matching leather boots. During the next days, Madonna performed "Hung Up" on TV shows such as Wetten, dass..? in Germany, and Star Academy in France, as well as on the Children in Need 2005 telethon in London. In order to promote the album's release, Madonna appeared on Parkinson. She played a number of songs from the album at London's Koko Club and G-A-Y as part of a promo tour to support the album.

In December, Madonna travelled to Japan, where "Hung Up" was performed on TV show SMAP×SMAP and her concert at Studio Coast. On February 8, 2006, Madonna opened the 48th Grammy Awards, by pairing up with the fictional animated band Gorillaz. The band appeared on the stage via a three dimensional technique which projected their holograms on the stage. They performed their song "Feel Good Inc." while rappers De La Soul made a guest appearance. Madonna then appeared on the stage and started performing the song while interchanging places with the hologram figures of the band. She was later joined by her own group of dancers and the performance was finished on the main stage rather than the virtual screen. Another performance of "Hung Up" came on April 30, 2006 during the Coachella Valley Music and Arts Festival in Indio, California.

A remix only album titled Confessions Remixed was also released in limited vinyl editions. In Japan, Confessions on a Dance Floor – Japan Tour Special Edition (CD+DVD) was released on August 23, 2006. It reached number 27 on the Oricon weekly albums chart and stayed on the chart for 12 weeks. The album received further promotion from the Confessions Tour which began in May 2006. The tour grossed over US $194.7 million, becoming highest-grossing tour ever for a female artist, at that time. Additionally, the tour received the "Most Creative Stage Production" at the Pollstar Concert Industry Awards, as well as "Top Boxscore" from the Billboard Touring Awards.

Singles 

"Hung Up" was released as the album's lead single on October 17, 2005. The song received critical appreciation amongst reviewers, who suggested that the track would restore the singer's popularity, which had diminished following the release of her 2003 album American Life. Critics claimed that it was her best dance track to date and have compared it to other Madonna tracks in the same genre. They also complimented the effective synchronization of the ABBA sample with Madonna's song. "Hung Up" became a worldwide commercial success, peaking atop the charts of 41 countries and earning a place in the Guinness Book of World Records along with the album. In the United States it became her 36th top ten hit, tying her with Elvis Presley. The corresponding music video was a tribute to John Travolta, his movies and dancing in general. Directed by Johan Renck, the video featured Madonna dancing in a ballet studio in a pink leotard, which she left to go to a gaming parlour to dance with her backup dancers. It also featured the physical discipline parkour.

"Sorry" was released as the second single from the album on February 6, 2006. The song received positive reviews from contemporary critics who declared the track as the strongest song on Confessions on a Dance Floor. It achieved commercial success, topping the singles charts in Italy, Spain, Romania and the United Kingdom, where it became Madonna's 12th number one single. Elsewhere, the song was a top ten hit in more than a dozen countries around the world. However, in the United States, the song was less commercially successful due to underplay on radio, but managed to reach the top of Billboards dance charts.

"Get Together" was released as the third single from the album by Warner Bros. Records on May 30, 2006. The decision was spurred by the fact that "Get Together" was the third most downloaded song from the album. It was also released to coincide with the start of Madonna's Confessions Tour. Critics complimented Madonna's ability to turn cliché comments into pop slogans with the song. The song became a success on the United States dance charts, but failed to enter the Hot 100. It reached the top ten in countries such as Australia, Canada, United Kingdom and Italy, and peaked at number one in Spain. 

"Jump" was released as fourth and the final single from the album on September 11, 2006. Critics complimented the song and its empowerment theme. The song peaked inside the top ten of the charts in some European countries, while reaching the peak position in Italy and Hungary. In the United States, "Jump" charted in several Billboard dance charts but failed to chart on the Hot 100.

Critical reception 

Confessions on a Dance Floor received acclaim from music critics. At Metacritic, which assigns a normalized rating out of 100 to reviews from mainstream critics, the album received an average score of 80, based on 28 reviews. Keith Caulfield from Billboard commented that Confessions is a "welcome return to form for the Queen of Pop." Stephen Thomas Erlewine from AllMusic commented that Confessions is the first album where Madonna sounds like a veteran musician since she created the record for "the dance clubs or, in other words, Madonna's core audience." Alan Braidwood from the BBC commented that "[t]his is the most commercial album Madonna has made in 15 years and it's magic." David Browne from Entertainment Weekly noted that for "all its pretenses of being giddy and spontaneous, though, Confessions is rarely either."

Alexis Petridis from The Guardian said that the album "may be a return to core values, but there's still a bravery about Confessions on a Dancefloor. It revels in the delights of wilfully plastic dance pop in an era when lesser dance-pop artists – from Rachel Stevens to Price's protege Juliet – are having a desperately thin time of it." Peter Robinson from Observer Music Monthly declared that the album ranks alongside Madonna's other albums like True Blue (1986) and Like a Prayer (1989). He credited producer Stuart Price for the album, noting that "Confessions clearly wouldn't exist without Madonna, but it's Price who steals the show." Stephen M. Deusner from Pitchfork noted that with the album "Madonna again reinvents herself, and it appears she's nearly lapped herself." According to Deusner, the music also makes her appear young. However he felt that the first half of the album till "I Love New York" was strong, while the second half "loses its delicate balance between pop frivolity and spiritual gravity."

Thomas Inskeep from Stylus Magazine stated that the album is "Madonna's most purely beat-driven album since her self-titled 1983 debut" and "easily her finest effort since Ray of Light." Kelefa Sanneh from The New York Times called the album "exuberant". Christian John Wikane from PopMatters commented that the album "proved that Madonna, approaching 50 years-old, is a vital force in the ever-expansive landscape of popular music." Joan Morgan from The Village Voice noted that "[w]ith Confessions on a Dance Floor, Madonna at long last finds her musical footing. Easily dance record of the year, Confessions is an almost seamless tribute to the strobe-lit sensuality of the '80s New York club scene that gave Madge her roots, which she explores with compelling aplomb." Josh Tyrangiel from Time magazine commented that "In dance music, words exist to be repeated, twisted, obscured and resurrected. How they sound in the moment is far more important than what they mean, and Madonna knows that better than anyone. Confessions on a Dance Floor is 56 minutes of energetic moments. It will leave you feeling silly for all the right reasons."

Sal Cinquemani from Slant Magazine was impressed with the album and said that "Madonna, with the help of Price, [...] has succeeded at creating a dance-pop odyssey with an emotional, if not necessarily narrative, arc — and one big continuously-mixed F you to the art-dismantling iPod Shuffle in the process." He compared the album to Australian recording artist Kylie Minogue's studio album Light Years (2000), saying "Comparisons to Light Years, Kylie Minogue's own discofied comeback album from 2000, are inevitable". Alan Light from Rolling Stone declared that the album illustrated that "Madonna has never lost her faith in the power of the beat." However, he opined that "Confessions on a Dance Floor won't stand the test of time like her glorious early club hits, but it proves its point. Like Rakim back in the day, Madonna can still move the crowd."

Commercial performance 

The album sold about 3.6 to 4 million copies worldwide during the first-week of release. Despite being released late in the year, Confessions on a Dance Floor was ranked by the International Federation of the Phonographic Industry (IFPI) as the sixth biggest-selling album of 2005 worldwide, with sales of 6.3 million. Worldwide sales of the album stand at 10 million copies, and is considered to be one of the best-selling albums of the 21st century as well one of the best-selling by women.

In the United States, the album debuted at number one on the Billboard 200 chart, selling 350,000 copies in its first week. It became her sixth number one album on the chart and the third consecutive album to debut at the top, following Music (2000) and American Life (2003). On December 14, 2005, the album was certified platinum by the Recording Industry Association of America (RIAA) for shipments of one million copies. As of December 2016, the album has sold over 1.734 million copies in America, according to Nielsen SoundScan. The album also debuted at the top of the charts in Canada, with first-week sales of 74,000. It was present on the chart for a total of 46 weeks and received a quintuple platinum certification from Music Canada (MC) for total shipment of 500,000 copies in the country.

Confessions on a Dance Floor enjoyed commercial success in Latin American countries. The album earned a gold certification in Chile and Brazil for the sales of 10,000 and 50,000 copies respectively. As of 2006, Confessions on a Dance Floor moved 80,000 units in Brazil. In Mexico, it received a platinum certification from AMPROFON for sales of 100,000 copies. In Argentina, the album became in one of the highest-certified albums of all time with five-time platinum from Cámara Argentina de Productores de Fonogramas y Videogramas (CAPIF) for total shipment of 200,000 units.

The album was also successful in Asia-Pacific countries. In Australia, Confessions on a Dance Floor debuted at the top of the ARIA Albums Chart for the issue dated November 21, 2005, and was present for a total of 33 weeks within the top 50 of the chart. It was certified two times platinum by the Australian Recording Industry Association (ARIA) denoting shipments of 140,000 copies. It debuted at number five on the New Zealand albums chart, and was certified platinum by Recorded Music NZ (RMNZ) for shipment of 15,000 copies. The same peak position was attained on the Oricon charts in Japan, where the album was certified double platinum for shipment of 500,000 copies by the Recording Industry Association of Japan (RIAJ). In Hong Kong, the album was awarded a Gold Disc Award by the IFPI for becoming one of ten biggest-selling international album for 2005.

The album found its biggest reception in Europe, where  topped the European Top 100 Albums chart for four weeks and was certified quadruple platinum by IFPI for shipping a total of four million copies across the continent. In the United Kingdom, Confessions on a Dance Floor debuted at the top of the UK Albums Chart with first-week sales of 217,610 units, her highest ever in the country. It became Madonna's ninth number-one album, and has sold 1,360,000 copies as of November 2020, according to the Official Charts Company, while being certified quadruple platinum by the British Phonographic Industry (BPI). That same week, the first single from the album, "Hung Up", topped the singles chart. The album became the fifth consecutive Madonna album to top the chart.  In Ireland, the album debuted and peaked at number three. In France, the album debuted at position 113 on the albums chart, jumping to the top of the chart the next week. According to Paris Match, Confessions on a Dance Floor sold 650,000 copies in the first two months in France, and was later certified diamond by the Syndicat National de l'Édition Phonographique (SNEP). Actual sales in France stand at between 800,000 to 900,000 units. In Italy, Musica e dischi reported sales of 400,000 copies during the 2005–2006 period, more than any other album by an international act and behind only Eros Ramazzotti's Calma apparente, Luciano Ligabue's Nome e Cognome and Io canto by Laura Pausini. Across Europe, the album peaked at number one in Austria, Belgium (Flanders and Wallonia), Denmark, Finland, France, Germany, Greece, Hungary, Norway, Poland, Spain, Sweden and Switzerland.

Accolades 

Madonna won the Best International Female Solo Artist at the 2006 BRIT Awards. She also won World's Best Selling Pop Artist and Best Selling U.S. Artist at the 2006 World Music Awards for the album. She was nominated for five awards at the 2006 MTV Video Music Awards for the music video of the album's first single, "Hung Up". Madonna also got nominated for Best Album of the Year, Best Pop Video, and Best Female Artist at the MTV Europe Music Awards 2006. She also won a Grammy Award in the category of "Best Dance/Electronic Album" at the 2007 ceremony. The album peaked at number one in 40 countries, earning a place in the Guinness World Records for topping the record charts in the most countries.

Rolling Stone ranked Confessions on a Dance Floor as the twenty-second top album of 2005. NME also placed it at number 29 on the magazine's list of the 50 best albums of 2005. Sal Cinquemani of Slant Magazine ranked the album at the third position on his list of the top ten albums of 2005. The same magazine considered the album the 38th best one from the 2000s. Three critics writing for Stylus Magazine also included Confessions on a Dance Floor in their year-end lists of the best albums of 2005. Q Magazine named the record the 26th best one of 2005. On their ranking of the best albums from 2005, The Observer listed the album at number 26. By the end of the 2000s, Slant Magazine placed the album at number 38 on their list of "The 100 Best Albums of the Aughts". In 2015, Confessions on a Dance Floor was ranked third on "The 99 Greatest Dance Albums of All Time" by Vice magazine.

Legacy 

Mike Nied from Idolator praised Confessions on a Dance Floor as one of the most influential pop albums of the decade and dubbed Madonna as a "timeless trendsetter" and "creative genius". According to Michael Arceneaux from NBC News, it is "arguably her last great, impactful album; it's the last time she still felt truly forward-thinking, even if it looked back sonically." Christopher Rosa from VH1 called it her "best album to date" and explained that is a "near-perfect pop record" and "her most natural reinvention". It was ranked as the third best dance album of all-time by Vice magazine—the highest peak by a female performer. The magazine staff commented: "This is the album all her subsequent albums is compared to; for its enduring relevance and how it redefined Madonna as an artist, it should be". Author Sancho Xavi from El País noted that the album started the disco revival during the 21st century and popularized the revivals concept of others musical genres during the first decade.

Justin Myers from the UK Official Charts Company commented: "An 'imperial phase' is when a pop star is at the pinnacle of their career, shifting stacks of records, having big hits, selling out arenas, owning the radio and being generally unavoidable and untouchable. Many pop acts barely manage one. Thanks to this album, Madonna claimed her third. How many popstars can honestly say that?" Calling her the "Mother of Reinvention", Jim Schembri from The Age wrote a detailed article of Madonna's impact with Confessions on a Dance Floor:
[The album] went straight to No. 1 everywhere except Mars. So too did the first single, "Hung Up", the video for which is on every time you turn on the TV. [Madonna] has reclaimed her place in the pop firmament with unrivaled ferocity. And she is a sterling example of pop survival. In a firmament that eats up artists like popcorn and where chart success is as fleeting as Jessica Simpson's attention span, Madonna remains an inspiring, intimidating beacon of permanence. Her longevity has thrived on her ability to continually reinvent herself by reading the winds of pop culture and taking her cue from there.

With the Confessions on a Dance Floor era, Madonna broke several world records and the album resuscitated her music sales and popularity, after the critical and commercial disappointment of American Life. At that time, Madonna became the best-selling female artist in the European market and the fifth best-selling artist overall with a quadruple platinum award by the IFPI, equivalent of 4 million copies sold across the continent. In the United Kingdom, Confessions on a Dance Floor became one of the fastest selling albums ever, with first week sales of 217,610 copies according to the Official Charts Company. Also, Madonna earned a place in the Guinness Book of World Records as the "oldest artist to simultaneously top the UK singles and album charts". Album's influence has been noted on other works, including Dua Lipa's 2020 album, Future Nostalgia, and Kim Petras's 2022 EP, Slut Pop.

Track listing 

Sample credit
 "Hung Up" samples "Gimme! Gimme! Gimme! (A Man After Midnight)" recorded by ABBA and written by Benny Andersson and Björn Ulvaeus.

Personnel 
Credits adapted from the album's liner notes.

Madonna – lead vocals, backing vocals, producer
Stuart Price – producer, keyboard, synthesizer, vocoder, programming, sequencing, sampling
Roberta Carraro – keyboard, bass, drums, harmonica
Yitzhak Sinwani – additional vocals on "Isaac"
Monte Pittman – guitar
Magnus "Mango" Wallbert – programming
Steven Klein – photography
Giovanni Bianco – art direction, graphic design
Grubman Indursky – legal documents
Guy Oseary – management
Angela Becker – management
Mark "Spike" Stent – mixing 
Stuart Price – mixing ; recording ("How High" and "Like It or Not") ; "Future Lovers" 
Alex Dromgoole – assistant engineer
David Emery – second assistant engineer
Antony Kilhoffer – second assistant engineer 
Brian "Big Bass" Gardner – mastering

Charts

Weekly charts

Monthly charts

Decade-end charts

All-time charts

Year-end charts

Certifications and sales

Release history

See also 

List of best-selling albums by women
List of best-selling albums of the 21st century
List of best-selling albums in Argentina
List of best-selling albums in France
List of best-selling albums of the 2000s in the United Kingdom
List of European number-one hits of 2005
List of European number-one hits of 2006
List of number-one albums in Norway
List of number-one albums of 2005 (Australia)
List of number-one albums of 2005 (Canada)
List of number-one albums of 2005 (Portugal)
List of number-one albums of 2005 (Poland)
List of number-one albums of 2005 (U.S.)
List of number-one electronic albums of 2005 (U.S.)
List of number-one electronic albums of 2006 (U.S.)
List of number-one hits of 2005 (France)
List of number-one hits of 2005 (Germany)
List of number-one hits of 2005 (Italy)
List of works by Stuart Price
Top selling singles and albums in Ireland 2005

Notes

References

External links 
 
 

2005 albums
Albums produced by Bloodshy & Avant
Albums produced by Stuart Price
Albums produced by Madonna
Concept albums
Grammy Award for Best Dance/Electronica Album
Madonna albums
Warner Records albums